The Feneș is a left tributary of the river Ampoi in Romania. It discharges into the Ampoi in the village Feneș.

References

Rivers of Romania
Rivers of Alba County